Páll Axel Vilbergsson (born 4 January 1978) is an Icelandic former basketball player who played for 22 seasons in the Úrvalsdeild karla and was a two time national champion. He was also a member of the Icelandic national team from 1996 to 2009. In 2004 he was selected as the Úrvalsdeild Domestic Player of the Year.

He was one of the most prolific three point shooters the Úrvalsdeild karla history and was its first player to make 1000 three points shots. In 2010 he tied the Úrvalsdeild record for most points scored by an Icelandic player in a single game when he scored 54 points against Tindastóll. In 2011 he made a controversial three pointer at the buzzer that won the Icelandic Super Cup for Grindavík.

Páll Axel last played for Division II club Njarðvík-b.

Icelandic national team
From 1996 to 2009, Páll Axel played 92 games for the Icelandic national basketball team.

Awards and accomplishments

Club honours
Icelandic championship (2): 1996, 2012
Icelandic Basketball Cup (2): 1995, 2006
Icelandic Super Cup (3) : 1996, 1998, 2011
Icelandic Company Cup (3) : 2000, 2009, 2011

Individual awards
Úrvalsdeild Domestic Player of the Year (1) : 2004
Úrvalsdeild Domestic All-First Team (6) : 2003, 2004, 2006–2008, 2010

Personal life
Páll Axel is the brother of Ármann Vilbergsson, who played several seasons in Úrvalsdeild karla.

References

External links
 Páll Axel Vilbergsson at eurobasket.com
 1993-2007 Úrvalsdeild statistics at kki.is
 2007-2016 statistics at kki.is
 Pall Axel Vilbergsson at realgm.com

1978 births
Living people
Pall Axel Vilbergsson
Pall Axel Vilbergsson
Pall Axel Vilbergsson
Pall Axel Vilbergsson
Pall Axel Vilbergsson
Pall Axel Vilbergsson
Pall Axel Vilbergsson
Pall Axel Vilbergsson
Pall Axel Vilbergsson
Pall Axel Vilbergsson
Pall Axel Vilbergsson